Teculután is a town and municipality in the Guatemalan department of Zacapa.

There is a Pollo Campero there and Pizza Burger Diner as well.

Sports
Deportivo Teculután football club play in Guatemala's second division, but spent 3 seasons at the highest domestic football level between 2001–2004.

They play their home games in the Estadio Julio Héctor Paz Castilla.

References

Municipalities of the Zacapa Department